The 2008 Maryland Terrapins men's soccer team represented the University of Maryland, College Park during the 2008 NCAA Division I men's soccer season. The team won its third NCAA College Cup title, and their first since 2005. The team included several future professional players, most notably, Graham Zusi and Omar Gonzalez.

Roster 
 

 
 
 
 
 
 
 
 
 
 
 
 
 

 
 
 
 
 

Source: UMTerps.com

Schedule

See also 
2008 Atlantic Coast Conference men's soccer season
2008 Atlantic Coast Conference Men's Soccer Tournament

References 

Maryland Terrapins
Maryland Terrapins men's soccer seasons
Maryland Terrapins
Maryland Terrapins
NCAA Division I Men's Soccer Tournament-winning seasons
NCAA Division I Men's Soccer Tournament College Cup seasons
2008